Hinduism is a minority religion in Hungary.

International Society for Krishna Consciousness
The International Society for Krishna Consciousness (ISKCON) runs the Bhaktivedanta Theological College in Hungary. The Hungarian government donated a building for the Bhaktivedanta Theological College.

Krishna devotees first appeared in Hungary at the end of the 1970s, but only in the second wave of the mission, in the mid 1980s, did a viable community develop.

Hare Krishnas in Hungary
The leaders of ISKCON mention 8,000-12,000 devotees living in Hungary.
According to Tamas Barabas (one of the leaders of the ISKCON), 190-200 live in temples, 700-900 practice their religion seriously, on the four festivals 9,000-10,000 persons gave their names, many of whom go to different Krishna programmes. 
The biggest ISKCON centre in Hungary is the rural community located in Somogyvamos, a small village in south-western Hungary.

Sivarama Swami is the official GBC representative in Hungary.

Hare Krishna centres in Hungary
Hare Krishnas have eight centres in Hungary.

Nandafalva Hindu Temple
It is located in the Csongrad County, 19 km from the Ópusztaszer National Heritage Park. The temple is a brilliant fusion of Hungarian and Hindu architectural styles .It was architectured by Gyula Szigeti.

It was built in 1979,Swami B.A. Narayan and his followers. Swami B.A. Narayan was sent to Hungary by his spiritual master A.C. Bhaktivedanta Swami Prabhupada. Nandafalva is named after the Indian holy place called Nandagram. After 20 years of activity, the Hindu Temple opened its doors in 2000. The 100 kilo bell residing in the temple tower resounds daily in accordance with Hungarian custom. After of disappearance of the founder in 1993 the community is led by Swami B.A. Paramadvaiti.

Krishna Valley

Krishna Valley is the ISKCON farm in Somogyvámos village in Hungary.It is 660-acre sustainable farm area which attracts thousands of tourists every year. At the moment, Krishna-valley has 150 inhabitants, and there are an additional 30,000 people yearly who visit there or participate at religious festivals. There is also an Eco-School in Krishna-valley.

Legal Status
Since 1989 the Community of the Hungarian Krishna conscious devotees (from now on ISKCON) is a registered religion in Hungary. At their incorporation they registered 50 persons.

The Parliament resolved that Hare Krishnas, Jehovah's Witnesses, The Hungarian Church of Scientology and the Unification Church being 'destructive sects', would not get government support.

In March 1994, the Parliament voted for governmental support of ISKCON and, by this, they withdrew the judgement of ISKCON as 'destructive' and recognised its religious life and charitable work.

In 2011,Hungary's new "Law on the Right to Freedom of Conscience and Religion, and on Churches, Religions and Religious Communities" was enacted and it recognized only 14 religious groups and 
Hinduism lost its official status. International Hindu organizations in Europe including Hindu Forum of Europe, Hindu American Seva Charities, Hindu Forum of Britain, Hindu American Foundation have expressed their concern about the issue at the Hungarian Embassies in their respective countries, as well as by sending letters directly to Prime Minister Viktor Orbán. In 2012,this law was amended and expand the list of officially recognized churches from 14 to a total of 32, which included Hungarian Society for Krishna Consciousness as a fully recognized churches in Hungary.

Brahma Kumaris Centres in Hungary
Brahma Kumaris has 4 Centres in Hungary

See also
Krishna valley of Hungary
Hinduism in Slovenia

References

External links
Sivaramaswami of Hungary
Krishna in heroes square: devotees of Krishna and national identity in post-communist Hungary
Hungarian Krishna-devotees for Religious Freedom
About Hungarian-Hindu Cultural Foundation
The Value System of Hungarian Krishna Devotees
ISKCON center in Hungary
Bhaktivedanta Theological College in Hungary
Hare Krishna in Hungary
Nandafalva
Online Vaishnava Encyclopedia